Jamyang Jamtsho Wangchuk is a Bhutanese actor and film producer. He was born in 1982 to an army captain and a teacher. Growing up in remote Bhutan, he was able to nurture his love for the natural world. Today he advocates for the environment.

He is known for his role as the 14-year-old Dalai Lama in the movie Seven Years in Tibet.  For this role he was nominated for the YoungStar Award. His younger brother Sonam starred in the role of the 8-year-old Dalai Lama.

In 2017, Jamyang studied film producing at the inaugural Busan Asian Film School in South Korea. A year later he wrote and directed his first short film, The Open Door, which premiered in Locarno Festival and won an award at the Seoul International Senior Film Festival.

Currently, Jamyang is gearing up for a cycling campaign to raise awareness on climate change issues.

Filmography 
Actor:
 1997: Seven Years in Tibet
 2013, 2015 (re-edited): Gyalsey - the legacy of a prince
 2016 Honeygiver Among the Dogs

Producer:
 2013, 2015 (re-edited): Gyalsey - the legacy of a prince

Music:
 2004: What Remains of Us (alternative title: Ce Qu'il Reste de Nous)

References

External links 
 

Bhutanese male actors
Living people
Bhutanese film producers
1982 births
Date of birth missing (living people)